Genes & Immunity is a peer-reviewed scientific journal covering the intersection between immunology and genetics. It was established in 1999 and is published eight times per year by Springer Nature. The editors-in-chief are Thomas Brunner (University of Konstanz) and Marie-Lise Gougeon (Pasteur Institute). According to the Journal Citation Reports, the journal has a 2021 impact factor of 4.248, ranking it 90th out of 161 journals in the category "Immunology" and 65th out of 175 in the category "Genetics & Heredity".

References

External links

Genetics journals
Immunology journals
Nature Research academic journals
Publications established in 1999
English-language journals